Bala Bəhmənli (also, Bala Begmenli and Bala-Bekhmanli) is a village and municipality in the Fuzuli District of Azerbaijan.  It has a population of 3,297.

References 

Populated places in Fuzuli District